The 1999 Brasil Open was a women's tennis tournament played on outdoor clay courts in São Paulo, Brazil. It was part of Tier IV of the 1999 WTA Tour. The tournament was held from October 4 through October 10, 1999. Fabiola Zuluaga won the singles title.

Entrants

Seeds

Other entrants
The following players received wildcards into the singles main draw:
  Joana Cortez
  Vanessa Menga

The following players received wildcards into the doubles main draw:
  Miriam D'Agostini /  Larissa Schaerer

The following players received entry from the singles qualifying draw:

  Gisela Riera
  Mariana Mesa
  Rossana de los Ríos
  Ainhoa Goñi Blanco

The following players received entry from the doubles qualifying draw:
  Mariana Mesa /  Romina Ottoboni

Champions

Singles

 Fabiola Zuluaga defeated  Patricia Wartusch, 7–5, 4–6, 7–5
 This was Zuluaga's second WTA title of the year and her career.

Doubles

 Laura Montalvo /  Paola Suárez defeated  Janette Husárová /  Florencia Labat, 6–7(7–9), 7–5, 7–5

References

 
Brasil Open